Murchad mac Flann mac Glethneachan was King of Maigh Seóla.

Biography

All that is known of Murchad is contained in an entry in the Annals of the Four Masters, sub anno 973, the year Murchadh Glunillar ua Flaithbheartach, King of Aileach, invaded Connacht and gave battle to King Cathal mac Tadg at Ceis Corran. Cathal was killed as were some of his prime vassals - "Geibheannach, son of Aedh, lord of Ui-Maine; Tadhg, son of Muircheartach, chief of Ui-Diarmada; Murchadh, son of Flann, son of Glethneachan, chief of Clann-Murchadha; and Seirridh Ua Flaithbheartaigh, with a countless number along with them."

Murchadh totally plundered Connaught afterwards, while Cathal was succeeded as King of Connacht by Cathal mac Conchobar mac Taidg.

See also

 Cathal mac Tadg, King of Connacht
 Geibennach mac Aedha, King of Uí Maine

References

 West or H-Iar Connaught Ruaidhrí Ó Flaithbheartaigh, 1684 (published 1846, ed. James Hardiman).
 Origin of the Surname O'Flaherty, Anthony Matthews, Dublin, 1968, p. 40.
 Irish Kings and High-Kings, Francis John Byrne (2001), Dublin: Four Courts Press, 
 Annals of Ulster at CELT: Corpus of Electronic Texts at University College Cork
 Byrne, Francis John (2001), Irish Kings and High-Kings, Dublin: Four Courts Press, 

People from County Galway
10th-century Irish monarchs